Mannie is a given name. Notable people with the name include:

Mannie Fresh, (born 1974), currently an artist and hip-hop producer who records for Def Jam South
Mannie Garcia, American freelance photojournalist currently based in Washington, D.C.
Mannie Heymans (born 1971), Namibian cyclist
Mannie Jackson (born 1939), the chairman and owner of the Harlem Globetrotters, for whom he played from 1962 to 1964
Mannie Rodriguez (born 1950), member of the Democratic National Committee from Colorado

See also
 "The Mannie" a name for the statue erected in memory of George Leveson-Gower, 1st Duke of Sutherland on Ben Bhraggie, Scotland
 Manny